Daniel St Clair (born 22 December 1987) is a Trinidad and Tobago cricketer. He made his first-class debut for Trinidad and Tobago in the 2014–15 Regional Four Day Competition on 28 November 2014.

References

External links
 

1987 births
Living people
Trinidad and Tobago cricketers
Place of birth missing (living people)